Sheep is a strategy puzzle video game released for PlayStation, Microsoft Windows and Game Boy Advance. In 2001 it was released for Mac OS X by Feral Interactive. The Game Boy Advance version was supposed to be released in North America in the spring of 2002, but was canceled for unknown reasons.

Gameplay
Sheep bears some resemblance to the video game Lemmings. The player can choose between 4 herders, the people Adam Halfpint and Bo Peep, and the dogs Motley and Shep.

The player must then guide sheep of 4 types (Factorial, Longwool, NeoGenetic, and Pastoral), actually aliens from the planet Ovis Aries, through a series of obstacles to the finish line in the level.

There are a series of different worlds, starting with Polygon Farm and on to others, such as Village Fete and Lost in Space. If you collect all the golden sheep trophies in a world, you get to play a bonus game, devised from some other, like Snake (in this version, you are riding a sheep, and have to collect the trapped sheep in bubbles).

The obstacles between you and victory vary from world to world, including tractors, knights, archers and demonic chefs. Eventually, you must thwart the schemes of the mad scientist Mr. Pear and his hench-cows.

Reception

Sheep received "mixed or average reviews" on all platforms according to the review aggregation website Metacritic. AllGame gave the PC version four stars out of five and called it "an impressive package, not only in that it delivers a highly addictive and well-executed game, but also because the premise is simple, well thought out and executed flawlessly." Daniel Erickson of Next Generation said that the same PC version was "As brilliant and original as Lemmings was in its day." In Japan, where the PlayStation version was ported and published by Syscom on 14 June 2001, followed by the Game Boy Advance version by Capcom under the name  on 19 April 2002, Famitsu gave it a score of 28 out of 40 for the latter version, and 24 out of 40 for the former. Nintendo Power gave the GBA version a favorable review a few months before its supposed release date, and GamePro also gave it a favorable review before it was canceled for unknown reasons.

Computer Games Strategy Plus nominated the PC version for their 2000 "Classic Game of the Year" award.

References

External links
 
 

2000 video games
Sheep video game
Game Boy Advance games
MacOS games
PlayStation (console) games
PlayStation Network games
Puzzle video games
Strategy video games
Video games about dogs
Windows games
Feral Interactive games
Empire Interactive games
Single-player video games
Video games developed in the United Kingdom
Mind's Eye Productions games